Brașov (Transylvanian Saxon: Kruhnen) is a city in Transylvania, Romania and the county seat (i.e. administrative centre) of Brașov County.

According to the 2021 census, Brașov is the 6th most populous city in Romania. The metropolitan area is home to 382,896 residents (as of 2011).

It is surrounded by the Southern Carpathians and is part of the historical region of Transylvania.

Historically, the city was the center of the Burzenland, once dominated by the Transylvanian Saxons, and a significant commercial hub on the trade roads between Austria (then Archduchy of Austria, within the Habsburg monarchy, and subsequently Austrian Empire) and Turkey (then Ottoman Empire). It is also where the national anthem of Romania was first sung.

Names

Brassovia, Brassó, Brașov, etc.
According to Dragoș Moldovanu, the name of Brașov came from the name of local river named Bârsa (also pronounced as "Bărsa") that was adopted by Slavs and transformed to Barsa, and later to Barsov, finally to Brasov. According to Pál Binder, the current Romanian and the Hungarian name  are derived from the Turkic word barasu, meaning "white water" with a Slavic suffix -ov. Other linguists proposed various etymologies including an Old Slavic anthroponym Brasa. The first attested mention of this name is Terra Saxonum de Barasu ("Saxon Land of Baras") in a 1252 document issued by Béla IV of Hungary. According to some historians, Corona was name of the city-fortress while Brassó was referring to the county, while others consider both names may refer to the city and the county as well.

Corona, Kronstadt
According to Balázs Orbán, the name Corona – a Latin word meaning "crown" – is first mentioned in the Catalogus Ninivensis in 1235 AD, stating a monastic quarter existed in the territory of the Roman Catholic Diocese of Cumania (In Hungaria assignata est paternitas Dyocesis Cumanie: Corona). Pál Binder supposed it is a reference to the St. Catherine's Monastery. Others suggest the name derives from the old coat of arms of the city, as it is symbolized by the German name Kronstadt meaning "Crown City". The two names of the city, Kronstadt and Corona, were used simultaneously in the Middle Ages, along with the Medieval Latin Brassovia.

Stephanopolis, Orașul Stalin

Another historical name used for Brașov is Stephanopolis, 'from "Stephanos", crown, and "polis", city.

From 1950 to 1960, during part of the Communist period in Romania, the city was called Orașul Stalin (Stalin City), lit. "Stalin City", after the Soviet leader Joseph Stalin, and was the capital of Stalin Region. The name change occurred on 22 August 1950, when Constantin Ion Parhon, the nominal Head of State at the time, issued a decree whereby Brașov was renamed "in honor of the great genius of working humanity, the leader of the Soviet people, the liberator and beloved friend of our people, Joseph Vissarionovich Stalin".

History

The oldest traces of human activity and settlements in Brașov date back to the Neolithic age (about 9500 BCE). Archaeologists working from the last half of the 19th century discovered continuous traces of human settlements in areas situated in Brașov: Valea Cetății, Pietrele lui Solomon, Șprenghi, Tâmpa, Dealul Melcilor, and Noua. The first three locations show traces of Dacian citadels; Șprenghi Hill housed a Roman-style construction. The last two locations had their names applied to Bronze Age cultures — Schneckenberg ("Hill of the Snails"; Early Bronze Age) and Noua ("The New"; Late Bronze Age).

Transylvanian Saxons played a decisive role in Brașov's development and were invited by Hungarian kings to develop towns, build mines, and cultivate the land of Transylvania at different stages between 1141 and 1300. The settlers came primarily from the Rhineland, Flanders, and the Moselle region, with others from Thuringia, Bavaria, Wallonia, and even France.

In 1211, by order of King Andrew II of Hungary, the Teutonic Knights fortified the Burzenland to defend the border of the Kingdom of Hungary. On the site of the village of Brașov, the Teutonic Knights built Kronstadt – 'the City of the Crown'. Although the crusaders were evicted by 1225, the colonists they brought in long ago remained, along with local population in three distinct settlements they founded on the site of Brașov:
Corona, around the Black Church (Biserica Neagră);
Martinsberg, west of Cetățuia Hill;
Bartholomä, on the eastern side of Sprenghi Hill.

Germans living in Brașov were mainly involved in trade and crafts. The location of the city at the intersection of trade routes linking the Ottoman Empire and Western Europe, together with certain tax exemptions, allowed Saxon merchants to obtain considerable wealth and exert a strong political influence. They contributed a great deal to the architectural flavor of the city. Fortifications around the city were erected and continually expanded, with several towers maintained by different craftsmen's guilds, according to the medieval custom. Part of the fortification ensemble was recently restored using UNESCO funds, and other projects are ongoing. At least two entrances to the city, Poarta Ecaterinei (or Katharinentor) and Poarta Șchei (or Waisenhausgässertor), are still in existence. The city center is marked by the mayor's former office building (Casa Sfatului) and the surrounding square (piața), which includes one of the oldest buildings in Brașov, the Hirscher Haus. Nearby is the "Black Church" (Biserica Neagră), which some claim to be the largest Gothic style church in Southeastern Europe.

In 1689, a great fire destroyed the walled city almost entirely, and its rebuilding lasted several decades.

Besides the German (Saxon) population living in the walled city and in the northern suburbs, Brașov had also a significant Romanian and Bulgarian population (living in the Șchei district), and also some Hungarian population (living in the Blumăna district). The cultural and religious importance of the Romanian church and school in Șchei is underlined by the generous donations received from more than thirty hospodars of Moldavia and Wallachia, as well as that from Elizabeth of Russia. In the 17th and 19th centuries, the Romanians in Șchei campaigned for national, political, and cultural rights, and were supported in their efforts by Romanians from all other provinces, as well as by the local Greek merchant community. In 1838, they established the first Romanian language newspaper Gazeta Transilvaniei and the first Romanian institutions of higher education: Școlile Centrale Greco-Ortodoxe ("The Greek-Orthodox Central Schools", today named after Andrei Șaguna). The Holy Roman Emperor and sovereign of Transylvania Joseph II awarded Romanians citizenship rights for a brief period during the latter decades of the 18th century.

In 1850, the town had 21,782 inhabitants: 8,874 (40.7%) Germans, 8,727 (40%) Romanians, 2,939 (13.4%) Hungarians. In 1910 there were 41,056 inhabitants: 10,841 (26.4%) Germans, 11,786 (28.7%) Romanians, 17,831 (43.4%) Hungarians.

On 29 August 1916, during the First World War, the Romanian Army occupied Brașov. Romanian troops entered the city at around five o'clock p.m. and paraded towards the city square. Romanian rule over the city lasted until early October, when the area was retaken by the Central Powers in the Battle of Brassó (7-9 October 1916). His term lasted from 29 August, when the city was occupied by the Romanian Army, until 8 October – the height of the Battle of Brașov. On 9 October, at the end of the battle, the previous mayor was reinstated.

Following the collapse of Austria-Hungary, the 1 December 1918 Proclamation of the Union of Alba Iulia, adopted by deputies of the Romanians from Transylvania, Banat, Crișana and Maramureș during the Great National Assembly of Alba Iulia declared the union of Transylvania into the Romanian state. Brașov was permanently occupied by Romanian forces on 7 December, as Hungarians gradually withdrew northwards. The King and some Transylvanians suggested that - because of Brașov's central geographical location in the new Romania - it should be considered as the new national capital. Though this did not happen - the inter-war period was a time of flourishing economy and cultural life in general, including the Saxons in Brașov. However, at the end of World War II many ethnic Germans were forcibly deported to the Soviet Union. A majority of them emigrated to West Germany after Romania had become a communist country.

The first Jewish community in Brașov was established in 1828, joining the Neolog association in 1868. Orthodox Jews founded their religious organization in 1877. The Neolog synagogue, seating 800, was built between 1899 and 1905. During the interwar period, the communities had separate institutions, but opened a jointly managed school in 1940. Zionist organizations appeared already in 1920. By 1930, Jews numbered 2594 individuals, or 4% of the total population. In autumn 1940, during the National Legionary State, the antisemitic Iron Guard nationalized all Jewish institutions and seized most shops owned by Jews. In 1941, Jews were drafted for service in forced labor battalions. Those from throughout southern Transylvania were concentrated in Brașov; a further 200 refugees came from Ploiești. In August 1942, 850 Jews between the ages of 18 and 50 were drafted into labor battalions and ordered to work in Brașov, while others were sent to Predeal and Bran. In spring 1943, 250 youths were sent to Suraia camp to build fortifications. By August 1944, the labor battalions were reduced to 250-300 while most of the Jews managed to obtain their freedom. In 1945–1946, the Jewish population increased to 3500.

Like many other cities in Transylvania, Brașov is also home to a significant ethnic Hungarian minority.

During the communist period, industrial development was vastly accelerated. Under Nicolae Ceaușescu's rule, the city was the site of the 1987 Brașov strike. This was brutally repressed by the authorities and resulted in numerous workers being imprisoned.

Economy 

Industrial development in Brașov started in the inter-war period, with one of the largest factories being the airplane manufacturing plant (IAR Brașov), which produced the first Romanian fighter planes used during World War II. After signing the armistice with USSR on September 12, 1944, the factory started repairing trucks, and in October 1945 it began manufacturing agricultural tractors. IAR 22 was the first Romanian-made wheeled tractor. In 1948 the company was renamed "Uzina Tractorul Brașov" known internationally as Universal Tractor Brașov.
A big part of the factory was demolished during 2013 and 2014 giving way to buildings, shopping mall and recreation parks.  Aircraft manufacturing resumed in 1968 at first under the name ICA and then under its old name of IAR at a new location in nearby Ghimbav.

Industrialization was accelerated in the Communist era, with special emphasis being placed on heavy industry, attracting many workers from other parts of the country. Heavy industry is still abundant, including Roman, which manufactures MAN AG trucks as well as native-designed trucks and coaches. Although the industrial base has been in decline in recent years, Brașov is still a site for manufacturing hydraulic transmissions, auto parts, ball-bearings, construction materials, hand tools, furniture, textiles and shoe-wear. There is also a large brewery.

Geography

Climate
Brașov has a humid continental climate (Köppen climate classification: Dfb).

Demographics 

Brașov has a total population of 253,200 (2011 census).
Its ethnic composition includes:

 Romanians: 208,019 (91.3%)
 Hungarians: 16,172 (7.1%)
 Germans (Transylvanian Saxons): 1,079 (0.5%)
 Romani people: 916 (0.4%)
 Other ethnicities: 1,037 (0.7%)

In 2005, the Brașov metropolitan area was created. With its surrounding localities, Brașov had 369,896 inhabitants .

Administration 

Brașov is administered by a Mayor and a Local Council. The current Mayor of Brașov (starting October 28, 2020) is Allen Coliban from Save Romania Union (USR).

The Brașov Local Council, elected at the 2020 Romanian local elections, is made up of 27 counselors, with the following party composition:

Education

Primary schools
 30 Primary Schools

High schools
Colegiul Național "Andrei Șaguna"
Colegiul Național "Dr. Ioan Meșotă"
Colegiul Național de Informatică "Grigore Moisil"
Colegiul Național "Unirea"

Colegiul Național "Áprily Lajos"
Liceul "Andrei Mureșanu"
Colegiul de Științe ale Naturii "Emil Racoviță"
Liceul "Nicolae Titulescu"
Liceul de Artă
Liceul cu Program Sportiv
Colegiul de Științe "Grigore Antipa"
Liceul Teoretic "Constantin Brâncoveanu"
Seminarul Teologic Liceal Ortodox "Dumitru Stăniloaie"
Colegiul Tehnic "Astra"
Colegiul Tehnic "Mircea Cristea"
Colegiul Tehnic "Iosif Silimon"
Colegiul Tehnic "Sfinții Voievozi"
Grupul Școlar de Arte și Meserii
Colegiul Tehnic "Remus Răduleț"
Colegiul Tehnic Feroviar
Grupul Școlar Industrial Auto
Colegiul Tehnic "Maria Baiulescu"
Grupul Școlar Industrial de Construcții Montaj
Colegiul National Economic "Andrei Bârseanu"
Grupul Școlar Silvic "Dr. Nicolae Rucăreanu"
Grupul Școlar de Turism și Alimentație Publică
Liceul "FEG"
Liceul "Europa Unită"

Universities
 Transilvania University of Brașov
 George Barițiu University
 Spiru Haret University
 Christian University Dimitrie Cantemir
 
 Fundația Universitară Sfinții Apostoli Petru și Pavel
 Sextil Pușcariu University
 Universitatea Româno-Canadiană
 American Hotel Academy

Transportation 

The Brașov local transport network has 44 urban bus and trolleybus lines and 10 metropolitan bus lines. There is also a regular bus line serving Poiana Brașov, a nearby winter resort and part of the city of Brașov. All are operated by RAT Brașov. Because of its central location, the Brașov railway station is one of the busiest stations in Romania with trains to/from most destinations in the country served by rail.

The Brașov-Ghimbav International Airport is an airport development project located in nearby Ghimbav, right by the future A3 motorway. It is the first airport to be developed in post-communist Romania, and the 17th commercial airport in the country. The contract for the construction of the main terminal building, with a total area of 11,780 m2 (126,799 sq ft), was awarded to the Romanian contractor Bog'Art Bucharest and was signed on 21 August 2019. Construction works for the passenger terminal started on 17 March 2020 and the first commercial flight is set to take place in June 2023.

CFR announced a feasibility study for the construction of a rail line (8 km) which would connect the future airport to the Brașov railway station.

Tourism 

With its central location, Brașov is a suitable location from which to explore Romania, and the distances to several tourist destinations (including the Black Sea resorts, the monasteries in northern Moldavia, and the wooden churches of Maramureș) are similar. It is also the largest city in a mountain resorts area. The old city is very well preserved and is best seen by taking the cable-car to the top of Tâmpa Mountain.

Brașov benefits from a winter tourism season centered on winter sports and other activities. Poiana Brașov is the most popular Romanian ski resort and an important tourist center preferred by many tourists from other European states.

The city also has several restaurants that serve local as well as international cuisine (e.g. Hungarian and Chinese). Some of these are situated in the city center.

Sights 

 Biserica Neagră ("The Black Church"), a celebrated Gothic site – the building dates from 1477, when it replaced an older church (demolished around 1385). It acquired the name after being blackened by smoke from the 1689 great fire.
 Franciscan Church, Brașov
 Casa Sfatului ("The mayor's former office building"). The administration for Brașov was here for more than 500 years.
 Biserica Sf. Nicolae (St. Nicholas Church), dating back to the 14th century.
 The First Romanian School, a museum with the first Romanian printing press among many other firsts.
 The Rope Street, the narrowest street in Romania.
 Black Tower, Old City Watch Tower.
 White Tower, Old City Watch Tower.
 Șchei, the historically Bulgarian but then Romanian neighborhood outside of the old walled city.
 Catherine's Gate, the only original city gate to have survived from medieval times.
 Șchei Gate, next to Catherine's Gate, built in 1827.
 Tâmpa, a small mountain in the middle of the city (900m above sea level), a sightseeing spot near the old city center.
 The "Brașov Citadel Fortress" – Cetățuia Brașovului
 The nearby Bran Castle, attracting many fans of Dracula and often (but incorrectly) said to have been the home of Vlad the Impaler.
 Poiana Brașov, mainly a ski resort but also a sightseeing spot.
 Râșnov Fortress, above the nearby town of Râșnov, is a restored peasant fortress
 Prejmer Fortress, in the nearby commune of Prejmer
 Saint George's Church, Brașov

Twin towns – sister cities

Brașov is twinned with:

 Bijeljina, Bosnia and Herzegovina
 Cleveland, United States
 Győr, Hungary
 Holstebro, Denmark
 Linz, Austria

 Musashino, Japan
 Rishon LeZion, Israel
 Tampere, Finland
 Tours, France
 Trikala, Greece

Sport 

The city has a long tradition in sports, the first sport associations being established at the end of the 19th century (Target shooting Association, Gymnastics School). The Transylvanian Sports Museum is among the oldest in the country and presents the evolution of consecrated sports in the city. During the communist period, universiades and Daciads were held, where local sportsmen were obliged to participate. Nowadays, the infrastructure of the city allows other sports to be practiced, such as football, rugby, tennis, cycling, handball, gliding, skiing, skating, mountain climbing, paintball, bowling, swimming, target shooting, basketball, martial arts, equestrian, volleyball or gymnastics. Annually, at "Olimpia" sports ground, the "Brașov Challenge Cup" tennis competition is held.

Colțea Brașov was the football champion in 1928, managing a second place in 1927, in its only 10 years of existence (1921–1931). It was succeeded by Brașovia Brașov.

Between 17 and 22 February 2013, the city hosted the 2013 European Youth Winter Olympic Festival.

, Brașov is hosting two trail semi-marathons: the Semimaraton Intersport Brașov (held in April) and the Brașov International Marathon (held in April or May).

In November 2013, Brașov submitted their bid for the 2020 Winter Youth Olympics. They were up against Lausanne, Switzerland to be awarded the event. In December that year, the city was signed the Youth Olympic Game Candidature Procedure. The host city was to be announced in July 2015, in which Lausanne was selected.

Local teams
SR Brașov – football club
ASC Corona Brașov – football club, women's handball and ice hockey club
CSU Brașov – basketball team
CFR Brașov – rugby football club

Sports venues
Planned
Brașov Arena (23,000 seats) – planned football stadium on the site of the former Municipal Stadium
Sala Polivalentă (10,059 capacity) - planned multi-purpose 10,059-seat indoor arena
Existing
Silviu Ploeșteanu Stadium (8,500 seats) – built in 1960 for football, floodlights were installed in 2009
Dumitru Popescu Colibași Sports Hall (2,300 seats) – built around 1970 for indoor sports: handball, basketball, volleyball, sometimes others
Brașov Olympic Ice Rink (2,000 capacity: 1,600 seated, 400 standing) – inaugurated on February 18, 2010, used mainly for ice hockey and public skating
Demolished
Municipal Stadium (30,000 capacity) – built in 1975, used for 1 May and 23 August parades, rarely used for football matches (demolished in 2008)
Others
Paradisul Acvatic - aquatic complex with 40m long swimming pool and three jumping platform (1 m, 3 m, 5.20 m)

Notable events
Tess Rally Brașov – The local round in the Romanian Rally Championship
BRD Brașov Challenger – A tennis tournament, part of the ATP Challenger Tour
Braşov International Marathon – Marathon – 42 km Course, Half-Marathon – 21 km Course 10,7 km & Team Run + 5,7 km Course

Media
The city of Brașov is home to several local media publications such as Transilvania Express, Monitorul Express, Bună Ziua Brașov or Brașovul Tău. Also, several local television stations exist, such as RTT, MIX TV and Nova TV.

Gallery

See also
 List of people from Brașov
 List of mayors of Brașov

Notes

References 
 
 "O istorie a Brașovului" ("A history of Brasov") – Ion Dumitrașcu, Mariana Maximescu, Phoenix, Brașov, 2001
 "Fortificația dacică de la Brașov – Pietrele lui Solomon" ("The Dacian citadel from Brașov – Pietrele lui Solomon"), Fl. Costea, CumidavaXX, Brașov, 1996
 "Săpăturile de salvare de pe dealul Șprenghi" ("The diggings for saving [the archaeological evidences] from Șprenghi Hill" – the hill was a quarry) A. Alexandrescu, N. Constantinescu, București, 1959
 "Die spätneolitischen Ansiedlungen mit bemalter Keramik aus oberem Laufe des Altflusses", J. Teutsch, Mitteilungen der Prehistorischen Komision, I, Wien.

Further reading

External links 

 City Hall official website
 Tourism official website
 German Cultural Center, kulturzentrum-kronstadt.ro
 Art Museum Brașov, muzeulartabv.ro

 
Capitals of Romanian counties
Castles of the Teutonic Knights
Cities in Romania
Populated places in Brașov County
Localities in Transylvania
Burzenland
De-Stalinization